The 1982 English cricket season was the 83rd in which the County Championship had been an official competition. India and Pakistan toured but both were defeated by England in their Test series. Middlesex won the County Championship.

Honours
County Championship - Middlesex
NatWest Trophy - Surrey
Sunday League - Sussex
Benson & Hedges Cup - Somerset
Minor Counties Championship - Oxfordshire
Second XI Championship - Worcestershire II 
Wisden - Imran Khan, Trevor Jesty, Alvin Kallicharran, Kapil Dev, Malcolm Marshall

Test series

India tour

Pakistan tour

In  May–July  the Indian cricket team in England in 1982 played 3 Tests and 2 ODIs. Pakistan played a similar itinerary from June to September.

Zimbabwe tour
The Zimbabwe team made its inaugural tour of England in 1982 and played two first-class matches, both of which were drawn.

County Championship

NatWest Trophy

Benson & Hedges Cup

Sunday League

External links
 Schweppes County Championship 1982 at CricketArchive
 Benson and Hedges Cup 1982 at CricketArchive
 John Player Special League 1982 at CricketArchive
 Minor Counties Championship 1982 at CricketArchive

Annual reviews
 Playfair Cricket Annual 1983
 Wisden Cricketers' Almanack 1983

References

English cricket seasons in the 20th century
English Cricket Season, 1982
Cricket season
International cricket competitions from 1980–81 to 1985